Every team has to submit a roster of 16 players. On December 16, 2011 an official squad list was published. On January 16 the official squad list was published.

Group A

Head coach: Ulrik Wilbek

Head coach: Bogdan Wenta

Head coach: Veselin Vuković

Head coach: Zoltán Heister

Group B

Head coach: Martin Lipták

Head coach: Martin Heuberger

Head coach: Zvonko Šundovski

Head coach: Staffan Olsson/Ola Lindgren

Group C

Head coach: Claude Onesta

Head coach: Lajos Mocsai

Head coach: Vladimir Maksimov

Head coach: Valero Rivera

Group D

Head coach: Slavko Goluža

Head coach: Guðmundur Guðmundsson

Head coach: Robert Hedin

Head coach: Boris Denić

References

External links
Official Website

2012 European Men's Handball Championship
European Handball Championship squads